Carlos Gabriel Hernandez is a Guatemalan professional racing cyclist.

Career highlights

2006
3rd National Road Race Championships
2007
3rd Overall Tour of Belize
1st Stage 8
3rd Apertura temporada Guatemala
3rd National Road Race Championships
2008
2nd Krem's New Year Cycling Classic

External links

Living people
Guatemalan male cyclists
Place of birth missing (living people)
Year of birth missing (living people)
21st-century Guatemalan people